Constantino Paul Castellano (June 26, 1915 – December 16, 1985), was an American crime boss who succeeded Carlo Gambino as head of the Gambino crime family. Castellano was killed in an unsanctioned hit on December 16, 1985.

Early life 
Castellano was born in Bensonhurst, Brooklyn in 1915, to Italian immigrants Giuseppe and Concetta Castellano (née Cassata). Giuseppe was a butcher and an early member of the Mangano crime family, the forerunner of the Gambino family.
Castellano dropped out of school in the eighth grade to learn butchering and collecting numbers game receipts, both from  In July 1934, Castellano was arrested for the first time in Hartford, Connecticut for robbing a haberdasher. The 19-year-old Castellano refused to identify his two accomplices to the police and served a three-month prison sentence. By refusing to cooperate with authorities, Castellano enhanced his reputation for mob loyalty.

Castellano's sister Catherine had married one of their cousins, future Mafia boss Carlo Gambino, in 1932. In 1937, Castellano married his childhood sweetheart Nina Manno; the couple had three sons (Paul, Philip, and Joseph Castellano) and a daughter, Constance Castellano; Manno died in 1999. He was of no relation to actor Richard S. Castellano from The Godfather, despite claims made by Richard's wife  after his death.

Castellano often signed his name as "C. Paul Castellano" because he hated his first name, Constantino. His first name at birth has been cited as both Constantino and Costantino.

Mob life 
In the 1940s, Castellano became a member of the Mangano family. He became a capo under boss Vince Mangano's successor, Albert Anastasia.

In 1957, after Anastasia's homicide and Carlo Gambino's elevation to boss, Castellano attended the abortive Apalachin meeting in Apalachin, New York. When New York State Police raided the meeting, Castellano was one of 61 high-ranking mobsters arrested. Refusing to answer grand jury questions about the meeting, Castellano spent a year in prison on contempt charges. On January 13, 1960, Castellano was sentenced to five years in prison for conspiracy to withhold information. However, in November 1960, Castellano's conviction was reversed by an Appeals Court.

Castellano identified more as a businessman than a hoodlum; he took over non-legitimate businesses and converted them to legitimate enterprises. But Castellano's businesses, and those of his sons, thrived from their mob ties.

In his early years, Castellano used his butcher's training to launch Dial Poultry, a poultry distribution business that once supplied 300 butchers in New York City. Dial's customers also included supermarket chains Key Food and Waldbaum's. Castellano used intimidation tactics to force his customers to buy Dial's products.

As Castellano became more powerful in the Gambino family, he started to make large amounts of money from construction concrete. Castellano's son Philip was the president of Scara-Mix Concrete Corporation, which exercised a near monopoly on Staten Island on construction concrete. Castellano also handled the Gambino interests in the "Concrete Club," a club of contractors selected by The Commission to handle contracts between $2 million and $15 million. In return, the contractors gave a two-percent kickback of the contract value to The Commission. Castellano also supervised Gambino control of Teamsters Union Local Chapter 282, which provided workers to pour concrete at all major building projects in New York and Long Island.

In 1975, Castellano allegedly had Vito Borelli, the boyfriend of his daughter Constance, murdered because he heard Borelli had compared him to Frank Perdue, the owner and commercial spokesman for Perdue Farms. In 2004, court documents revealed that Joseph Massino, a government witness and former Bonanno crime family boss, admitted murdering Borelli as a favor to Castellano.

Succession 
On October 15, 1976, Carlo Gambino died at home of natural causes. Against expectations, he had appointed Castellano to succeed him over his underboss Aniello "Neil" Dellacroce. Gambino appeared to believe that his crime family would benefit from Castellano's focus on white collar businesses. Dellacroce, at the time, was imprisoned for tax evasion and was unable to contest Castellano's succession.

Castellano's succession was confirmed at a meeting on November 24, with Dellacroce present. Castellano arranged for Dellacroce to remain as underboss while directly running traditional Cosa Nostra activities such as extortion, robbery, and loansharking. While Dellacroce accepted Castellano's succession, the deal effectively split the Gambino family into two rival factions.

In 1978, Castellano allegedly ordered the murder of Gambino associate Nicholas Scibetta. A cocaine and alcohol user, Scibetta participated in several public fights and insulted the daughter of George DeCicco. Since Scibetta was Salvatore "Sammy the Bull" Gravano's brother-in-law, Castellano asked Frank DeCicco to first notify Gravano of the impending hit. When advised of Scibetta's fate, a furious Gravano said he would kill Castellano first. However, Gravano was eventually calmed by DeCicco and accepted Scibetta's death as the punishment earned by his behavior.

In 1978, Castellano allegedly ordered the murders of Gambino capo James Eppolito and his son, mobster James Eppolito Jr. Eppolito Sr. had complained to Castellano that Anthony Gaggi was infringing on his territory and asked permission to kill him. Castellano gave Eppolitto a noncommittal answer, but later warned Gaggi about Eppolito's intentions. In response, Gaggi and soldier Roy DeMeo murdered Eppolito senior and junior.

In February 1978, Castellano made an agreement between the Gambino family and the Westies, an Irish-American gang from Hell's Kitchen, Manhattan. Castellano wanted hitmen that law enforcement could not tie directly to the Gambino family. The Westies wanted Gambino protection from the other Cosa Nostra families. The Gambino–Westie alliance was set in a meeting between Westies leader James Coonan and Castellano. According to Westies gangster Mickey Featherstone, Castellano gave them the following directive:
You guys got to stop acting like cowboys – acting wild. You're going to be with us now. If anyone is going to get killed, you have to clear it with us.  Castellano also created an alliance with the Cherry Hill Gambinos, a group of Sicilian heroin importers and distributors in New Jersey, also for use as gunmen. With the Westies and the Cherry Hill Gambinos, Castellano commanded a small army of capable killers.

In September 1980, Castellano allegedly ordered the murder of his former son-in-law Frank Amato. A hijacker and minor criminal, Amato had physically abused his wife Connie Castellano (Paul's daughter) when they were married. According to FBI documents, Gambino soldier Roy DeMeo murdered Amato, cut up his body, and disposed of the remains at sea.

In 1981, Castellano met twice with businessman Frank Perdue, the alleged cause of the 1975 Borelli murder. Perdue wanted Castellano's help in thwarting a unionization drive at a Perdue facility in Virginia. However, according to Perdue, the two men talked, but never agreed to anything.

At the height of his power, Castellano built a lavish 17-room mansion on a ridgeline in Todt Hill on Staten Island. He started a love affair with his  Colombian maid, Gloria Olarte. Castellano became a recluse, rarely venturing outside the mansion. Capos such as Daniel Marino, Thomas Gambino, and James Failla visited Castellano at Todt Hill to provide information and receive orders. When not entertaining guests, Castellano wore satin and silk dressing gowns and velvet slippers around 

John Gotti, Dellacroce's former protégé, rapidly became dissatisfied with Castellano's leadership, regarding the new boss as being too isolated and greedy. Like other members of the family, Gotti also personally disliked Castellano. The boss lacked street credibility, and those who had paid their dues running street level jobs did not respect him. Gotti also had an economic interest: he had a running argument with Castellano on the split Gotti took from hijackings at Kennedy Airport. Gotti was also rumored to be expanding into drug dealing, a lucrative trade Castellano had banned.

Legal problems 
In January 1983, Castellano allegedly ordered the murder of Roy DeMeo, who was found shot to death in the trunk of his Cadillac automobile. In March 1983, the FBI obtained a warrant to install secret listening devices in Castellano's house. Waiting until Castellano went on vacation to Florida, agents drugged his watch dogs, disabled his security system, and planted devices in the dining and living rooms. These devices provided law enforcement with a wealth of incriminating information on Castellano.

In August 1983, Angelo Ruggiero and Gene Gotti were arrested for dealing heroin, based primarily on recordings from a bug in Ruggiero's house. Castellano, who had banned made men from his family from dealing drugs under threat of death, demanded transcripts of the tapes, and, when Ruggiero refused, threatened to demote Gotti.

On March 30, 1984, Castellano was indicted on federal racketeering charges in the Gambino case, including the Eppolitto and DeMeo murders. Other charges were extortion, narcotics trafficking, theft, and prostitution. Castellano was released on $2 million bail.

On February 25, 1985, Castellano was one of many Mafia bosses arrested on charges of racketeering, which was to result in the Mafia Commission Trial; he was released on $3 million bail.

On July 1, 1985, Castellano was indicted on loansharking charges and with tax evasion for not reporting the profits from his illegal racket, and pleaded not guilty.

On November 4, 1985, in a testimony from car thief Vito Arena, Castellano was named the head of the stolen-car ring that employed him, as well as having been connected to five murders.

Conspiracy 
Dellacroce died of cancer on  starting a chain of events that led to Castellano's murder two weeks  Several factors contributed to the conspiracy to kill Castellano; his failure to attend Dellacroce's wake was an insult to the Dellacroce family and his followers. Secondly, Castellano named his bodyguard Thomas Bilotti as the new underboss. A Castellano loyalist, Bilotti was a brutish loanshark with little of the diplomatic skill required as underboss. Castellano also hinted that he was breaking up Gotti's crew.

Gravano suggested killing both Castellano and Bilotti while they were eating breakfast at a diner. However, when DeCicco tipped Gotti off that he would be having a meeting with Castellano and several other Gambino mobsters at Sparks Steak House on December 16, Gotti and the other conspirators decided to kill him then.

Murder 
On Monday, December 16, 1985, Bilotti drove Castellano to the prearranged early evening meeting at Sparks Steak House in Midtown Manhattan, on East 46th Street near Third Avenue. A hit team (consisting of Salvatore Scala, Edward Lino and John Carneglia) waited near the restaurant entrance; positioned down the street were backup shooters Dominick Pizzonia, Angelo Ruggiero, and Tony Rampino. Gotti and Gravano observed the scene from a car across the street.

As Castellano was exiting the car at the front of the restaurant at around 5:26 pm, the gunmen ran up and shot him several times. Allegedly, John Carneglia was the gunman who shot Castellano in the head. Bilotti was shot as he exited from the driver's door. Before leaving the murder scene, Gotti drove over to view the bodies.

Aftermath 
Castellano was buried in the Moravian Cemetery in the New Dorp section of Staten Island. The Archdiocese of New York refused to grant Castellano a Catholic funeral, citing his notorious life and death.

Two weeks after Castellano's murder, a meeting of capos in a Manhattan basement elected Gotti, age 45, as the new Gambino boss. The Castellano murder enraged Vincent Gigante, boss of the Genovese crime family, because Gotti never received permission for the act from the Commission. Gigante solicited the help of Lucchese crime family boss Anthony Corallo to kill Gotti. On April 13, 1986, a car bomb meant for Gotti exploded outside a Bensonhurst social club, but the only casualty was Frank DeCicco.

Gotti was arrested by the FBI in late 1990 on racketeering charges and denied bail 10 days later. On April 2, 1992, with the help of Gravano becoming a government witness, Gotti was convicted of numerous racketeering charges, including the 1985 Castellano murder. On June 23, Gotti was sentenced to life in federal prison, where he died of throat cancer in 2002. No one else was ever charged in the Castellano murder.

Media portrayals 
 Jazz pianist Gene DiNovi portrays Castellano in the 1994 TV film Getting Gotti
 Richard C. Sarafian portrays Castellano in the 1996 HBO network original film Gotti
 Abe Vigoda portrays Castellano in the NBC network TV movie Witness to the Mob (1998)
 Sam Coppola portrays Castellano in the 2001 Canadian-American TV movie The Big Heist
 Chazz Palminteri portrays Castellano in Boss of Bosses, a 2001 film on the TNT network.
 Donald John Volpenhein portrays Castellano in the biopic 2018 Gotti based on John Gotti, Jr.'s 2015 book Gotti: In The Shadow Of My Father
 Subject of the Fear City: New York vs The Mafia (2020) Netflix documentary

Notes

References

External links 

Paul Castellano's Death Certificate
Paul Castellano  – Biography.com

1915 births
1985 deaths
1985 murders in the United States
American butchers
American crime bosses
Bosses of the Gambino crime family
Deaths by firearm in Manhattan
Murdered American gangsters of Sicilian descent
People from Bensonhurst, Brooklyn
People from Todt Hill, Staten Island
People murdered by the Gambino crime family
People murdered in New York City
Male murder victims
Burials at Moravian Cemetery
Catholics from New York (state)
Assassinated people